Meunier is a French surname meaning "miller".

Meunier may also refer to:

 Pinot Meunier, aka Meunier; a variety of wine grape
 Meunier rifle, WWI French battle rifle
 Mount Meunier, Kohler Range, Antarctica
 Meunier Museum, Brussels, Belgium; named after sculptor Constance Meunier

See also

 
 Menier (disambiguation)
 Minier (surname)
 Mounier (surname)
 Munier (surname)